Dustin Farr Colquitt (born May 6, 1982) is an American football punter who is a free agent. He played college football at Tennessee and was selected by the Kansas City Chiefs in the third round of the 2005 NFL Draft. With the Chiefs, he won Super Bowl LIV over the San Francisco 49ers. He has also played for the Pittsburgh Steelers, Jacksonville Jaguars, Atlanta Falcons, and Cleveland Browns.

In 2019, he set a Chiefs franchise record for most games played, surpassing former teammate Will Shields.

Early life
Colquitt is from Knoxville, Tennessee, and played football and soccer at Bearden High School in Knoxville.

College career
Colquitt accepted an athletic scholarship to attend the University of Tennessee in Knoxville, and played for coach Phillip Fulmer's Tennessee Volunteers football team from 2001 to 2004.  As a junior in 2003, he was recognized as a first-team All-Southeastern Conference (SEC) selection, and a consensus first-team All-American.  As a senior in 2004, he again earned first-team All-SEC honors.

Professional career

Kansas City Chiefs

The Kansas City Chiefs selected Colquitt in the third round (99th pick overall) of the 2005 NFL Draft. He then signed a three-year contract worth $1.345 million.

During the 2007 NFL season, he set the franchise record for the longest punt with an 81 yard punt. On February 28, 2008, Colquitt was signed to a five-year contract extension worth $8.5 million. 
Colquitt had career highs during the 2009 NFL season in both punts and punting yards with 96 and 4,361, respectively. His 4,361 punting yards were second to Jim Arnold's 4,397 during the 1984 NFL season. In 2010, he was voted as the winner of the Ed Block Courage Award.

In the 2012 season, he had a punting average of 46.8, the highest he has ever had in a season. From 2005 to 2012, Colquitt had 657 career punts with a 44.7 yard average. Colquitt was named to his first Pro Bowl in 2012. On March 5, 2013, Colquitt signed a five-year contract extension worth $18.75 million, with $8.9 million guaranteed, making him the NFL's highest paid punter.

In 2016, Colquitt was named to his second Pro Bowl after fellow punter Pat McAfee declined to play due to an injury. During the 2017 NFL season, he became the Chiefs all-time leader in both punts and punting yards passing Jerrel Wilson. On March 15, 2018, Colquitt signed a three-year contract extension with the Chiefs. During the 2019 season, Colquitt played in and won his first Super Bowl after the Chiefs defeated the San Francisco 49ers 31–20.

Colquitt was released on April 28, 2020. In his 15 seasons with the Chiefs, he set multiple team records including being tied with fellow punter Jerrel Wilson for the longest tenured player in franchise history.

Pittsburgh Steelers
Colquitt signed a one-year contract with the Pittsburgh Steelers on September 7, 2020. He was released on October 23.

Tampa Bay Buccaneers
On December 18, 2020, Colquitt signed with the practice squad of the Tampa Bay Buccaneers.

Jacksonville Jaguars
Colquitt was signed off the Buccaneers' practice squad by the Jacksonville Jaguars on December 24, 2020. He was waived on January 5, 2021.

Kansas City Chiefs (second stint)
On January 7, 2021, right before the playoffs, Colquitt signed with the practice squad of the Kansas City Chiefs. His practice squad contract with the team expired after the season on February 16, 2021.

Atlanta Falcons
Colquitt signed with Atlanta Falcons' practice squad on September 21, 2021. He was promoted to the active roster on October 5. After missing two games due to COVID-19, he was released on December 6 in favor of Thomas Morstead.

Cleveland Browns
Colquitt was signed by the Cleveland Browns on December 10, 2021.

NFL career statistics

Accomplishments
 Chiefs franchise record for longest punt (81 yards, 2007)
 Chiefs franchise record for games played by any position (238)
 Chiefs franchise record for seasons played (15, tied)
 Chiefs franchise record for punting yards (50,393)
 Chiefs franchise record for punts (1,124)
 2nd most punts downed inside of the 20 in NFL history (483)

Personal life
Colquitt is married with five children. Colquitt comes from a family with a distinguished lineage of punters, including his father Craig, who played for the Pittsburgh Steelers from 1978 to 1984. His younger brother Britton, who is currently a Free Agent, also played for Tennessee, as did his uncle Jimmy. After winning Super Bowl LIV, Colquitt became the third member of his family to win a Super Bowl (Craig won XIII and XIV, Britton won 50 with the Broncos).

Colquitt is a Christian.

Colquitt is a co-founder of TeamSmile, an organization that offers free dental care to underserved children. Colquitt was picked to be the Chiefs nominee for the Walter Payton NFL Man of the Year Award in 2009 and 2018.

References

External links

 
Atlanta Falcons bio

1982 births
Living people
All-American college football players
American football punters
Kansas City Chiefs players
Pittsburgh Steelers players
Tampa Bay Buccaneers players
Tennessee Volunteers football players
Players of American football from Knoxville, Tennessee
Colquitt family
American Conference Pro Bowl players
Jacksonville Jaguars players
Atlanta Falcons players
Cleveland Browns players
Ed Block Courage Award recipients